Hayden Partain (born October 14, 1994) is an American former soccer player.

Career

College and Amateur
Partain played four years of college soccer at Wake Forest University between 2013 and 2016.

While at college Partain appeared for Premier Development League side Charlotte Eagles in 2015. Following college, Partain played with Des Moines Menace in the Premier Development League.

Professional
On August 5, 2017, Partain signed for United Soccer League side Sacramento Republic.

References

External links
Sacramento Republic FC player profile

1994 births
Living people
American soccer players
Association football midfielders
Charlotte Eagles players
Des Moines Menace players
People from Frisco, Texas
Sacramento Republic FC players
Soccer players from Texas
Sportspeople from the Dallas–Fort Worth metroplex
USL Championship players
USL League Two players
Wake Forest Demon Deacons men's soccer players
San Antonio FC players